Stefan Brennsteiner (born 3 October 1991) is an Austrian World Cup alpine ski racer, and specializes in giant slalom. He has competed in two Winter Olympics and three World Championships.

Brennsteiner made his World Cup debut at age 21 in October 2012 at Sölden, Austria, and reached his first podium in February 2021 at Bansko, Bulgaria.

Career
Brennsteiner began competing as a junior in December 2006. His first win came in 2010, in the Giant slalom at the Austrian National Junior Race. He represented Austria in the Giant Slalom at the 2018 Winter Olympics, however, failed to finish his second run.

Brennsteiner achieved his first World Cup podium in February 2021 in Bansko; after finishing his first run in fifth position, he moved ahead of Alexis Pinturault and Henrik Kristoffersen after his second run, finishing in third position. A month later, he finished in third position at Kranjska Gora, 0.03 seconds behind Loïc Meillard.

Brennsteiner once again represented Austria in the 2022 Winter Olympics. He competed in the Mixed Team event, in which Austria won the Gold medal, Brennsteiner beating Julian Rauchfuss in his Final heat. He also competed in the Giant Slalom, recording the second-fastest time on his first run, however a mistake in his second run caused him to lose his medal position.

In March 2022, Brennsteiner finished in second place in Kranjska Gora, the first time he had finished above third. He recorded the fastest time of the field in his first run; however, he fell behind Henrik Kristoffersen on his second run.

World Cup results

Season standings

Race podiums
 0 wins
 3 podiums - (3 GS); 12 top tens

World Championship results

Olympic results

References

External links
 

Sten Brennsteiner at the Austrian Ski team official site 

1991 births
Living people
Austrian male alpine skiers
Alpine skiers at the 2018 Winter Olympics
Alpine skiers at the 2022 Winter Olympics
Olympic alpine skiers of Austria
People from Zell am See
Sportspeople from Salzburg (state)
Medalists at the 2022 Winter Olympics
Olympic medalists in alpine skiing
Olympic gold medalists for Austria